Nonso Anozie (born 17 November 1978) is an English actor. On television, he is known for his roles in the HBO series Game of Thrones (2012), the Sky series Dracula (2013), the CBS series Zoo (2015–2017), and the Netflix series Sweet Tooth (2021–). For the latter, he won a Children's and Family Emmy Award and was nominated for a BAFTA.

He led the film Cass (2008). His films since include RocknRolla (2008), The Grey (2011), Ender's Game (2013), Cinderella (2015), and Guava Island (2019).

Early life
Anozie was born on 17 November 1978 in North London to Nigerian Igbo People parents.  Anozie attended St Aloysius College, Highgate. He graduated from the Central School of Speech and Drama in 2002, and in the summer of the same year he played the title role in William Shakespeare's King Lear, and won the Ian Charleson Award in 2004 for his performance in Othello.

Career
Anozie was hired in 2006 to provide the voice for the armoured bear Iorek Byrnison in the film adaptation of Philip Pullman's Northern Lights. Anozie was replaced by Ian McKellen two months before the film was set to be released. The film's director, Chris Weitz, told Empire: "It was a studio decision ... You can understand why you would cast Ian McKellen for anything. But letting go of Nonso was one of the most painful experiences on this movie for me. I need to say about Nonso that he is one of the most promising and soulful young actors I have encountered in England and I've worked here for quite a bit now and he's actually in the next Mike Leigh [film] ... But it was, uh, that was kind of a dark day for me. I kinda wanna go out of my way to point out how much I love Nonso's work. And that's that."

Anozie played small roles as Think Tank in Guy Ritchie's film RocknRolla and Frank Mace in Joe Wright's Atonement. He played the lead in Cass, a 2008 British crime drama film recreating the life of Cass Pennant. In 2009, he appeared in the supporting cast of the BBC TV three-part 2003 Iraq War drama, Occupation, where he played a US Marine turned private military contractor. In 2011, he played Artus, a Zamoran pirate and close friend of Conan, in Conan the Barbarian. That year, he was also cast to play the role of Xaro Xhoan Daxos in the HBO series Game of Thrones and was cast as Jackson Burke in The Grey. He also plays the role of Samson in the History Channel's television miniseries The Bible.  In 2013, Anozie appeared in the film Ender's Game as Sergeant Dap, and from 2013 to 2014 he played the role of Renfield on the NBC series Dracula.

In November 2014, Anozie was cast in the CBS summer drama Zoo, based on the novel by James Patterson and Michael Ledwidge. Zoo premiered on 30 June 2015.

Anozie's radio work includes the role of Joe in the 2011 BBC Radio 4 Classic Serial production of Edna Ferber's Show Boat.

In 2019, Anozie portrayed the antagonist, Cargo, in the Amazon Prime Video film Guava Island, starring Donald Glover and Rihanna.

Personal life
Anozie is married and has a son (b. 2019). He supports Liverpool FC. He is a practicing Christian.

Filmography

Films

Television

Video games

Accolades

References

External links

 

1978 births
Living people
21st-century English male actors
Alumni of the Royal Central School of Speech and Drama
Black British male actors
Emmy Award winners
English male film actors
English male stage actors
English male television actors
English male voice actors
English Pentecostals
English people of Igbo descent
English people of Nigerian descent
Male actors from London
People from the London Borough of Camden
Ian Charleson Award winners
Igbo male actors